Nook Pasture railway station  served the village of Canonbie, Dumfriesshire, Scotland, from 1864 to 1873 on the Waverley Line. The station was located across the Scottish border in Cumbria.

History 
The station opened on 2 January 1864 by the Border Union Railway. A public footpath that ran west from Nook Farm crossed the track. The station had no buildings or goods facilities. The station was presumed to have opened for John Forster, who had a large shareholding in the Border Union Railway. It closed in 1873, when he was presumed to have ceased to be a shareholder.

References 

Disused railway stations in Cumbria
Railway stations in Great Britain opened in 1864
Railway stations in Great Britain closed in 1873